Habropoda is a genus of anthophorine bees in the family Apidae. There are at least 50 described species in Habropoda.

Species

References

 Michener, Charles D. (2000). The Bees of the World, xiv + 913.
 Michener, Charles D. (2007). The Bees of the World, Second Edition, xvi + 953.

Further reading

 Arnett, Ross H. (2000). American Insects: A Handbook of the Insects of America North of Mexico. CRC Press.

Apinae
Bee genera